The Omegans is a 1968 American  science fiction thriller film directed by W. Lee Wilder and starring Keith Larsen, Ingrid Pitt and Lucien Pan. It was shot on location in the Philippines.

Cast
 Keith Larsen as Chuck 
 Ingrid Pitt as Linda 
 Lucien Pan as Valdemar 
 Bruno Punzalan as Oki 
 Joaquin Fajardo as Tumba 
 John Yench as McAvoy 
 Jeorge Santos as Clerk 
 Joseph de Cordova as Dr. Salani 
 Lina Inigo as Singer

References

Bibliography
 Mayer, Geoff. Roy Ward Baker. Manchester University Press, 2004.

External links
 

1968 films
1960s thriller films
American thriller films
Films directed by W. Lee Wilder
Films shot in the Philippines
Paramount Pictures films
1960s English-language films
1960s American films